Firefly (Garfield Lynns) is a supervillain appearing in American comic books published by DC Comics. Created by France Herron and Dick Sprang, he made his debut in Detective Comics #184 (June 1952). Initially portrayed as a criminal who utilized lighting effects to commit robberies, Firefly was later reimagined as a sociopathic pyromaniac with an obsessive compulsion to start fires following Crisis on Infinite Earths reboot of the DC Universe in the 1980s. This darker depiction of the character has since endured as one of the superhero Batman's most recurring enemies and belongs to the collective of adversaries that make up his central rogues gallery.

Firefly has been featured in various forms of media, including several shows set within the DC animated universe, The Batman cartoon series, the first season of The CW's live-action Arrowverse television series Arrow portrayed by Andrew Dunbar, and the Batman: Arkham video game franchise. Additionally, a female version of the character named Bridgit Pike appeared in the television series Gotham, portrayed by Michelle Veintimilla and Camila Perez with this version predating the version that later appeared the comics.

Fictional character biography

Pre-Crisis

Garfield Lynns was a down-and-out film special effects expert whose plan to rob a theater by faking a fire was foiled by Batman and Robin. As Lynns fled the scene, Batman mistook a distant firefly for Lynns' lit cigarette and gave chase in the wrong direction. Lynns saw this as a sign of fate and became the Firefly, a costumed criminal who utilized various lighting effects and optical illusions during heists.

Post-Crisis
Following Crisis on Infinite Earths reboot of the DC Universe, Firefly was re-imagined as a much darker and more violent character.

After being taken away from their abusive parents, Garfield Lynns and his sister, Amanda, grew up at the St. Evangelina Home for Orphans. Unlike his relatively normal sister, Garfield was a problematic child whom nobody wanted to adopt. As an adult, Lynns became a pyrotechnics and special effects expert in the film industry but eventually fell victim to Gotham City's severe poverty issues and turned to a life of crime as a result. While he initially only committed arson during his robberies as a hobby, Lynns' compulsion to start fires soon turned into a pyromaniacal obsession as a result of his abusive and troubled childhood; he believed that he could see visions in the flames he created.

Lynns then becomes a professional arsonist known as the "Firefly", and allies himself with fellow supervillain Killer Moth in an attempt to kill Batman and Robin. Their alliance falls apart, however, when Killer Moth realizes the full extent of Firefly's madness and feared for his own well-being. The two villains are then taken into custody. During the Batman: Knightfall storyline, Firefly escapes from Arkham Asylum and attempts to burn all of the places that he lacked the privilege to go to as a child. After successfully destroying a pier and a theater, Firefly is stopped by Batman as he tries to scorch the Gotham Zoo. In his next attempt to burn Gotham to the ground, Firefly is horribly scarred when an uncontrollable fire that he starts at a chemical factory causes it to explode; over 90 percent of his body is burned, so he designs a fireproof battle suit to protect himself from his own flames from this point on.

During the No Man's Land story arc, Firefly is one of the inmates at Blackgate Penitentiary when it is taken over by Lock-Up. When Nightwing is captured after trying to retake the prison from Lock-Up, Firefly attempts to kill him and wear his skin over his burned body.

During the DC One Million crisis, Firefly nearly burns down Gotham while infected with the Hourman virus, requiring Nightwing and Robin to work with the future Batman to stop him.

Firefly makes a short appearance in the Justice League of America story arc "Crisis of Conscience", fighting Catwoman in Gotham City over a diamond before Batman arrives. Although an epic battle between the Secret Society of Super Villains and the Justice League ensues, Firefly is knocked unconscious and remains that way during the entire battle. He makes another short appearance in the 2005 miniseries Villains United when the Secret Six attempts to escape the Society's grasp.

Firefly is among the numerous heroes and villains apparently murdered by the OMACs in the pages of DC's The OMAC Project, although he later appears alive in Villains United: Infinite Crisis Special and Gotham Underground. Firefly appears with Mr. Freeze facing Batman (though Firefly is wearing the same uniform as the Firefly design of The Batman). He and Mr. Freeze are again shown as having worked together a month after the events of the Crisis, Batman working with a redeemed Harvey Dent to take them down before he takes his year of absence while leaving Dent to guard Gotham.

Following the Final Crisis, Firefly was with Cheetah's Secret Society of Super Villains at the time when Genocide was created. He was defeated by Wonder Woman alongside Shrapnel, Phobia, and T. O. Morrow.

Firefly is recruited by a new Black Mask to be a part of a group of villains that are aiming to take over Gotham, but he follows his own agenda. Inspired by the chemicals that Black Mask used on him, Firefly inserts chips into Gothamites in order to make them burn. Not long after the identity of the new Black Mask was revealed to be Jeremiah Arkham, Firefly was arrested and put into Arkham Asylum. A short time later, Firefly is broken out of Arkham Asylum by Dick Grayson, who has assumed the mantle of Batman, to assist him in gaining access to Sebastian Blackspell's closest friends. Batman (Dick) desires to know what Blackspell's true intentions are in regards to killing the Riddler.

Powers and abilities
Following Crisis on Infinite Earths reboot of the DC Universe, Firefly's depiction was drastically altered from that of a mere criminal who utilized colored lights and optical illusions to that of a violent sociopath with intense pyromania. Even prior to becoming Firefly, Garfield Lynns was already an expert in pyrotechnics and explosives with a thorough knowledge of flammable agents. After he is horribly scarred by a blaze at a chemical factory, Lynns mechanically engineered an insulated, fireproof battle suit to protect himself. This specialized outfit is equipped with an extensive arsenal of fire-creating weapons, including a military-grade flamethrower, various incendiary devices (such as grenades, napalm, and smoke bombs), and a sword-like blade of superheated plasma for close-ranged hand-to-hand combat. A high-tech, winged jet pack is also mounted on the back of the armor to allow for high-speed flight.

Other characters named Firefly

Ted Carson
A man named Ted Carson becomes the second character to adopt the identity of the "Firefly". Created by Bill Finger and Sheldon Moldoff, he first appeared in Batman #126. Carson was an ostentatiously wealthy gold mine heir who gambled his family fortune away and subsequently turned to a life of crime as the second Firefly. Carson then goes on a robbery spree before being apprehended by Batman and Batwoman.

In 2011, "The New 52" rebooted the DC universe. Ted Carson is a former high school teacher who tries to incinerate everything that will separate him from his ex-girlfriend Cindy Cooke, though he is ultimately defeated by Nightwing and Batgirl.

In 2016, DC Comics implemented another relaunch of its books called DC Rebirth, which restored its continuity to a form much as it was prior to The New 52. Ted Carson and Killer Moth attempt to kill Batman to collect Two-Face's multi-million dollar bounty. Carson is later seen as one of the many villains that Bane pummels in his quest to reach Batman at Arkham Asylum. During the gang war between the Joker and the Riddler, Carson is shown siding with the Riddler's faction.

Bridgit Pike
Ted Carson's protégé Bridgit Pike (a character introduced in the TV series Gotham) adopts the identity of Lady Firefly. She first appeared in Detective Comics #988 (September 2018) and was created by James Robinson and Stephen Segovia. She and Carson are hired by Kobra to kill Batman while he investigates a murder.

Other versions

Flashpoint
In an alternate reality created during Flashpoint, Firefly is seen as a member of Canterbury Cricket's Ambush Bugs before he is killed in battle against the Amazons.

In other media

Television

Live-action
 Garfield Lynns appears in the Arrow episode "Burned", portrayed by Andrew Dunbar. This version is a former member of the Starling City firefighting unit "The Fireflies" who was thought to have been killed during a massive building fire. Having survived the blaze despite being left disfigured, Lynns became a vengeful recluse. After his wife leaves him and takes their children, Lynns dons a firefighter uniform and begins killing his old crewmates for leaving him behind. This attracts the attention of the Hood, who eventually defeats him. Following this, Lynns commits suicide.
 A female version of Firefly named Bridgit Pike appears in Gotham, portrayed by Michelle Veintimilla in season two and the second half of season four and by Camila Perez in season three and the first half of season four. Bridgit is the quasi "stepsister" of arsonists Joe, Cale, and Evan Pike, who abused her and had her work around their apartment in the Narrows. After Evan was killed by James Gordon and Nathaniel Barnes, Bridgit is forced to help Joe and Cale burn down Wayne Enterprises buildings at the behest of Oswald Cobblepot and Theo Galavan. However, she goes to her old friend Selina Kyle for help and the two rob a brothel so Bridgit can leave Gotham City. When Joe and Cale kidnap and threaten her, Bridgit kills them with a flamethrower. During a confrontation with Gordon, a gas leak results in Bridgit accidentally setting herself on fire. She is brought to Arkham Asylum, where Professor Hugo Strange heals her and gives her a new fireproof suit. When Kyle breaks into Arkham, she discovers Bridgit developed amnesia and believes she is the "goddess of fire". Kyle convinces Bridgit to let the former become the latter's servant so they can escape, only to be stopped by Mr. Freeze. Following their fight, Bridgit escapes before the facility explodes. As of season three, she regained her memories and began working at a metal refinery before Cobblepot and Ivy Pepper convince her and Freeze to join them in retaking Cobblepot's criminal empire from the Riddler. In season four, Bridgit continues to work for Cobblepot before joining Jerome Valeska's "Legion of Horribles" to assist in their plan to disperse the Scarecrow's fear toxin throughout Gotham. While helping the Legion take Gotham's mayor and his staff hostage however, Bridgit is defeated by Bruce Wayne. When Jeremiah Valeska destroys Gotham's bridges and declares the city a "no man's land" in the season four finale, Bridgit and her gang claim the Bowery district.

Animation

 The Garfield Lynns incarnation of Firefly appears in series set in the DC Animated Universe, voiced by Mark Rolston. This version is a former pyrotechnics engineer who was fired by his singer ex-girlfriend Cassidy for botching a pyrotechnics display during one of her concerts.
 He is introduced in The New Batman Adventures episodes "Torch Song" and "Legends of the Dark Knight", with the former seeing him attempting to get revenge on Cassidy before Batman foils him. The producers had wanted to use Firefly in the preceding series, Batman: The Animated Series, but Fox forbade them from using pyromaniac characters.
 Firefly returns in the Justice League episode "Only a Dream", in which he forms a casual interest in the similarly-themed Volcana.
 The Garfield Lynns incarnation of Firefly appears in The Batman, voiced by Jason Marsden. This version's suit bears a design more akin to his namesake, uses a jetpack that buzzes while he is flying, and wields lasers built into the suit's knuckles instead of a flamethrower. Following his introduction in the episode "The Big Heat", he has several encounters with Batman and other Gotham City supervillains over the course of the series, such as Mr. Freeze in the episode "Fire and Ice". In the episode "White Heat", Firefly and Dr. Jane "Blaze" Blazedale steal a phosphorus isotope to upgrade his suit, but an accident causes the isotope to mutate Lynns into the pyrokinetic metahuman Phosphorus. He goes insane and attempts to destroy Gotham, only to be defeated by Batman and remanded to Arkham Asylum.
 The Garfield Lynns incarnation of Firefly appears in Batman: The Brave and the Bold, voiced by Robin Atkin Downes. This version is based on his Pre-Crisis counterpart.
 Firefly appears in the Harley Quinn episode "There's No Ivy in Team", voiced by Alan Tudyk.

Film
 Firefly appears in Batman: Bad Blood, voiced by Steve Blum. This version is a mercenary working for the League of Assassins and serves as one of Talia al Ghul's henchmen and Killer Moth's partner before he is seemingly killed in an explosion.
 The Ted Carson incarnation of Firefly was set to appear in the cancelled DC Extended Universe film Batgirl, portrayed by Brendan Fraser. This version was a disgruntled veteran who lost his benefits and sought to burn down Gotham City.

Video games

Lego series
 Firefly appears as an unlockable character in the Nintendo DS version of Lego Batman: The Video Game.
 Firefly appears in Lego Batman 3: Beyond Gotham, voiced again by Robin Atkin Downes. This version is a member of the Legion of Doom and his appearance is based on his design in The Batman animated series.
 Firefly appears as a playable character in Lego DC Super-Villains, voiced again by Crispin Freeman.

Batman: Arkham

The Garfield Lynns incarnation of Firefly appears in the Batman: Arkham video game series, voiced by Crispin Freeman. This version is an unhinged and obsessive pyromaniac with burns on 90% of his body.
 He first appears in the prequel Batman: Arkham Origins (2013) as one of eight assassins hired by the Joker disguised as Black Mask to kill Batman. Following a meeting with the Joker, Firefly plants explosives on the Gotham Pioneers' Bridge and takes several hostages to draw Batman out, but the vigilante defuses the bombs with Gotham City Police Department Captain James Gordon's help and defeats Firefly before leaving him for the police.
 Firefly returns in Batman: Arkham Knight (2015). The side mission "The Line of Duty" reveals that prior to the game's events, Gotham City Fire Department Chief Raymond Underhill gave Firefly a list of abandoned buildings to burn down in hopes of preventing his firefighters from being laid off. However, the arsonist betrayed Underhill and kidnapped him and his crew during Scarecrow's takeover of Gotham City. Upon discovering what happened, Batman saves the captured firemen from Firefly's thugs and uncovers Underhill's corruption. In the side mission "Gotham on Fire", Firefly attempts to burn down Gotham's firehouses, but Batman pursues, defeats, and imprisons him at the GCPD lockup.

Miscellaneous
 The Garfield Lynns incarnation of Firefly appears in Smallville Season 11. He temporarily obtains a yellow power ring from Parallax and becomes a powerful Yellow Lantern, but is depowered by Batman and returned to Arkham Asylum.
 Firefly makes a minor appearance in Batman: The Brave and the Bold.
 The Garfield Lynns incarnation of Firefly appears in a tie-in prequel comic for the DC Extended Universe film Batman v Superman: Dawn of Justice.
 Firefly appears in DC Super Hero Girls, voiced by Khary Payton.

Merchandise
 DC Collectibles released a 7-inch action figure of Firefly in Series 2 of their Batman: Arkham Origins line, based on his design in the 2013 video game of the same name. This statue was sculpted by Gentle Giant Studios.
 Lego released a minifigure of Firefly in the set "Bat Mech vs Poison Ivy Mech". This version's appearance is based on his design from The Batman animated series and Lego DC Super-Villains.

See also
 List of Batman family enemies

References

External links
 Firefly (Garfield Lynns) at DC Comics Wiki
 Firefly (Ted Carson of Earth-One) at DC Comics Wiki
 Firefly (Ted Carson of Prime-Earth) at DC Comics Wiki
 Firefly (Garfield Lynns) at Comic Vine
 Firefly (Ted Carson) at Comic Vine
 

DC Comics female supervillains
Batman characters
Burn survivors in fiction
Characters created by Dick Sprang
Characters created by France Herron
Comics characters introduced in 1952
DC Animated Universe characters
DC Comics male supervillains
DC Comics orphans
DC Comics television characters
Fictional arsonists
Fictional characters with disfigurements
Fictional characters with fire or heat abilities
Fictional characters with neurological or psychological disorders
Fictional characters with respiratory diseases
Fictional marksmen and snipers
Fictional mass murderers
Fictional mechanical engineers
Fictional mercenaries in comics
Fictional rampage and spree killers
Golden Age supervillains
Video game bosses
Villains in animated television series
Comics characters introduced in 2018